Luozi Airport  is an airport serving Luozi, a Congo River port in Kongo Central Province, Democratic Republic of the Congo.

See also

Transport in the Democratic Republic of the Congo
List of airports in the Democratic Republic of the Congo

References

External links
OpenStreetMap - Luozi
OurAirports - Luozi
FallingRain - Luozi Airport

Airports in Kongo Central Province